Mountainside High School is one of six comprehensive high schools in Beaverton, Oregon. It opened in September 2017 with students in grades 9 and 10. It added a junior class in the fall of 2018, and a senior class the following year. The school graduated its first class in spring of 2020. It takes its name from its proximity to Cooper Mountain.

Notable alumni

Cameron Brink- an American college basketball player for the Stanford Cardinal

Academics
Mountainside is an International Baccalaureate school. Students at Mountainside will have the opportunity to take classes in the Middle Years Programme and the Diploma Programme.

AVID is also offered schoolwide at Mountainside.

Athletics
Mountainside participates in the OSAA 6A-2 Metro League, along with the other Beaverton schools.

References

High schools in Washington County, Oregon
2017 establishments in Oregon
Beaverton School District
Educational institutions established in 2017
Public high schools in Oregon